Assiut University is a university located in  Assiut, Egypt. It was established in October 1957 as the first university in Upper Egypt.

Statistics
Faculty members: 2,442
Assistant lecturers and demonstrators: 1,432
Administrative staff: 11,686
Other service assistants: 3,815

Faculties and institutes 
The university includes 16 faculties and three institutes.
Faculty of Science
Faculty of Engineering
Faculty of Agriculture
Faculty of Medicine
Faculty of Pharmacy
Faculty of Veterinary Medicine
Faculty of Commerce
Faculty of Education
Faculty of Law
Faculty of Physical Education
Faculty of Nursing
Faculty of Specific Education
Faculty of Education (New Valley regional Campus)
Faculty of Social Work
Faculty of Arts
Faculty of Computers and Information
Faculty of dentistry
Faculty of Sugar and Integrated industries technology 
South Egypt Cancer Institute (SECI)
Technical Institute of Nursing
Faculty of Agriculture (New Valley Branch)

Notable alumni
Ibrahim Deif
Gamal Helal
Saad El-Katatni
Shukri Mustafa
Mustapha Bakri
Abdel Nasser Tawfik
Mohammed Tayea

References

External links 

 Official website.
 
 
 Assiut University Alumni Group.

 
Educational institutions established in 1957
1957 establishments in Egypt